Kristin Roers (born 1977) is an American politician. She is a member of the North Dakota State Senate from the 27th District, elected in 2018. She is a member of the Republican party.

Education and career
Kristin Roers was born March 24, 1977 in Lyon County, Minnesota. She earned a BS in Economics from South Dakota State University, a BS, Nursing from South Dakota State University and an MS in Nursing and Healthcare Systems Administration from the University of Minnesota.

Political career

North Dakota Senate election of 2016
In 2018 Kristin Roers announced she was running to represent District 27 in the North Dakota Senate.

Personal
Her cousin Shannon Roers Jones and uncle Jim Roers were elected as Representative and Senator, respectively, in North Dakota legislative District 46 in 2016.

References

Republican Party North Dakota state senators
21st-century American politicians
21st-century American women politicians
1977 births
Living people
People from Lyon County, Minnesota
Women state legislators in North Dakota